Fürüzan İkincioğulları (born 4 February  1933) is a high-level jurist and the first female President of the Council of State in Turkey.

Fürüzan İkincioğullar was born in Ödemiş ilçe (district) of  İzmir Province on 4 February 1933. She graduated from the Law School of Ankara University in 1957. On 25 December 1958, she was appointed to the Council of State. On 13 April 1974, she was elected member of the council board. On 15 February 1990, İkincioğulları was elected as the president of the Council of  State's 6th Division. On 30 March 1994, she was elected as the president of Council of State . She retired on 4 February 1998. 

İkincioğulları was the first president of the Council of State. After İkincioğulları, two other women were also served as the president, Sumru Çörtoğlu (2006–2008) and Zerrin Güngör (2013–present).

References

Living people
1933 births
People from Ödemiş
Ankara University Faculty of Law alumni
Turkish jurists
Turkish women civil servants
Turkish civil servants
Women jurists
Presidents of the Council of State (Turkey)